Thomas Gillies (born 7 March 1990) is a former Australian rules footballer for the Geelong Football Club and the Melbourne Football Club in the Australian Football League (AFL).

Early life
Tom began his career with the Traralgon-based Tedas Junior Football Club. He then went on to play with the Narre Warren Football Club which led to getting selected to play for the Dandenong Stingrays in the TAC Cup.

AFL career
Gillies was selected by Geelong with the 33rd pick in the 2008 AFL Draft.

He made his debut in Round 15 of the 2009 AFL season against Brisbane and played in six of the last eight games of the year.  At the end of the year he was awarded Geelong's best first year player award.

Post AFL
In 2014 he began playing for St Mary's in the Geelong Football League.

Statistics

|- style="background-color: #EAEAEA"
| 2009 ||  || 25 || 6 || 0 || 0 || 23 || 37 || 60 || 12 || 5 || 0.0 || 0.0 || 3.8 || 6.2 || 10.0 || 2.0 || 0.8
|-
| 2010 ||  || 25 || 0 || — || — || — || — || — || — || — || — || — || — || — || — || — || —
|- style="background-color: #EAEAEA"
| 2011 ||  || 25 || 2 || 0 || 0 || 8 || 8 || 16 || 4 || 1 || 0.0 || 0.0 || 4.0 || 4.0 || 8.0 || 2.0 || 0.5
|-
| 2012 ||  || 25 || 5 || 1 || 0 || 40 || 33 || 73 || 26 || 9 || 0.2 || 0.0 || 8.0 || 6.6 || 14.6 || 5.2 || 1.8
|- style="background-color: #EAEAEA"
| 2013 ||  || 27 || 2 || 0 || 0 || 9 || 7 || 16 || 5 || 0 || 0.0 || 0.0 || 4.5 || 3.5 || 8.0 || 2.5 || 0.0
|- class="sortbottom"
! colspan=3| Career totals
! 15
! 1
! 0
! 80
! 85
! 165
! 47
! 15
! 0.1
! 0.0
! 5.3
! 5.7
! 11.0
! 3.1
! 1.0
|}

References

External links

Geelong Football Club players
Living people
1990 births
Australian rules footballers from Victoria (Australia)
Dandenong Stingrays players
Melbourne Football Club players
St Mary's Sporting Club Inc players
Casey Demons players
People from Traralgon
Waratah Football Club players